Tema Community 4 is a residential area in Tema in the Greater Accra Region of Ghana. This part of tema is known for the Chemu Secondary Secondary School.  The school is a second cycle institution.

References

Populated places in the Greater Accra Region
Tema